Lake Lucy is a lake in Carver County, Minnesota, in the United States. The lake was named for the wife of Burritt S. Judd, an early settler.

See also
List of lakes in Minnesota

References

Lakes of Minnesota
Lakes of Carver County, Minnesota